Mayhaw is an unincorporated community in Miller County, in the U.S. state of Georgia.

History
A post office called Mayhaw was established in 1888, and remained in operation until 1907. The community was named for the abundance of mahaw trees near the original town site.

References

Unincorporated communities in Miller County, Georgia
Unincorporated communities in Georgia (U.S. state)